David McFarland (June 7, 1822April 25, 1902) was an American farmer, politician, and Wisconsin pioneer.  He served in the Wisconsin State Senate and Assembly, representing Iowa County.

Early life and education
McFarland was born on June 7, 1822, in Bovina, New York. He attended Delaware Academy in Delhi, New York.  He moved to the Wisconsin Territory in 1846 and established a farm in the town of Highland, in Iowa County.

Career
McFarland was appointed to the Iowa County Board of Supervisors in 1862.  Later that year was elected to the Wisconsin State Assembly on the National Union ticket, representing the northern half of Iowa County.  He served many years as justice of the peace, town chairman, town assessor, and school superintendent of Highland.  He also served as "fund commissioner" for the county in 1873 to settle a railroad indebtedness issue for Iowa County.  He was elected to the Wisconsin State Senate in 1874, running on the Reform platform—a short-lived coalition of Democrats, Liberal Republicans, and Grangers.  He was not a candidate for re-election in 1876.

McFarland and his family moved to West Bend, Iowa, in 1883, and then moved to Mora, Minnesota, in 1896.  McFarland died at his home in Mora on April 25, 1902.  He was buried with his wife in West Bend, Iowa.

Personal life and family
McFarland married Eliza Johnston on August 8, 1847.  They had at least four children together.  McFarland was active in Freemasonry.

References

People from Delaware County, New York
People from Iowa County, Wisconsin
Wisconsin state senators
Members of the Wisconsin State Assembly
Mayors of places in Wisconsin
County supervisors in Wisconsin
School superintendents in Wisconsin
American justices of the peace
Wisconsin Reformers (19th century)
19th-century American politicians
1822 births
1902 deaths
Educators from New York (state)
19th-century American judges
19th-century American educators